Bourdieu v. Pacific Western Oil Co., 299 U.S. 65 (1936), was a decision by the United States Supreme Court, which held that an inquiry into indispensability would be unnecessary where the complaint did not state a cause of action.

Background
Pacific Western Oil Corporation was established by Edward L. Doherty in 1928 before later coming under the control of J. Paul Getty and owned oil and gas drilling rights for large sections of Fresno County, California. An agricultural landowner had "mining" rights for the same area and sued. The oil companies asserted that, since their leases were issued by the United States Secretary of State, that they could not be sued without including the U.S. government but the court disagreed.

See also
List of United States Supreme Court cases, volume 299

Further reading

United States Supreme Court cases
United States civil procedure case law
1936 in United States case law
United States Supreme Court cases of the Hughes Court
Texaco
History of Fresno County, California
Petroleum in California
Oil and gas law
United States lawsuits